Aéropostale, is an American shopping mall–based retailer of casual apparel and accessories, principally targeting young adults and teenagers through its Aéropostale stores. Aéropostale maintains control over its proprietary brands by designing, sourcing, marketing, and selling all of its own merchandise. The company operates Aéropostale stores in the United States and through its e-commerce site. 

Aéropostale's licensees operate Aéropostale and P.S. from Aéropostale locations in the Middle East, Asia, Europe, and Latin America.
The first Aéropostale stores were opened in 1987 by R H Macy & Co. in Thousand Oaks, California, and in Short Hills, New Jersey.

Pronunciation
Many different pronunciations of the brand name have developed in the United States: arrow-PAUSE-tall, arrow-PUS-tall-ee etc.. According to a video posted by the company on YouTube, the English pronunciation is a simplified version of the French word, which means "French airmail service." In French, it's /a e ʁɔ pɔs ˈtal/. In English, it's /ˌɛər oʊ poʊ ˈstɒl/ or, in spelling pronunciation, "arrow-post-ALL."

Subsidiaries
The now-defunct P.S. from Aéropostale began in 2009, and originally only offered apparel at value prices to the 7–12 age market. In winter of 2011, P.S. added apparel for three-, four-, five- and six-year-olds to their collections, being introduced with the Holiday clothings. Beginning in November 2013, the Bethany Mota collection was added to Aéropostale stores, featuring clothing and accessories designed by American video blogger Bethany Mota. Also beginning in the fall of 2013, the Live Love Dream collection (LLD) was added to Aéropostale stores. Live Love Dream features lounge and activewear geared to girls. The company also offered a secondary brand called Jimmy'Z that focused on surf and skater clothing. The 14 stores were branded as more upscale with higher price points than its parent chain. The company closed all Jimmy'Z in fiscal 2009.

In October 2014, the company launched their latest collection, United XXVI, which features clothing with an edgier look. The company works with video bloggers Nash Grier, Hayes Grier, and Cameron Dallas to create these looks based on the type of clothing the boys enjoy.

Aéropostale currently has the following brands for girls: Free State, Hobie, Invite Only, Junie & Jade, Lorimer, Map to Mars, The Bikini Lab, United XXVI. And for boys: Free State, United XXVI.

Competition
Aéropostale mainly competes with other outfitters, Abercrombie & Fitch and its subsidiary retailer Hollister Co., and American Eagle Outfitters as well as a few smaller brands. Aéropostale's younger brand, P.S. from Aéropostale, competed with brands such as A&F's younger subsidiary Abercrombie Kids and, formerly, American Eagle's 77kids.

Promotions
In 2007, the company began doing promotions with successful figures to increase brand awareness, and since 2008  started to collaborate with non-profit organisations and artists.

Legal issues
 In March 2007, Aéropostale was accused of infringing a patent owned by Card Activation Technologies, Inc. in a lawsuit filed in the Northern District of Illinois. In a separate lawsuit on the same patent, Card Activation received a ruling on claim construction which it interpreted as "extremely favorable" to its interpretation of the patent and its "pursuit of infringers" of the patent.
 In June 2007, Aéropostale was accused of infringing a patent owned by Picture Patents, LLC in a lawsuit filed in the Southern District of New York.
 In July 2009, Aéropostale was accused of infringing a patent owned by Furnace Brook, LLC in a lawsuit filed in the Northern District of Illinois.
Executive Vice President and Chief Merchandising Officer Christopher Finazzo was terminated in November 2006 after an investigation by the Board of Directors revealed that he had concealed and failed to disclose personal and business interests with South Bay Apparel, a major vendor. The SEC issued an investigation on the Finazzo matter in January 2008. A criminal indictment was unsealed and announced June 11, 2010 in U.S. Court in Brooklyn, NY charging Finazzo and Doug Dey, the owner of South Bay with wire and mail fraud conspiracy. Finazzo was convicted on 16 counts, including 14 counts of mail fraud and one each for wire fraud and conspiracy on April 25, 2013.

2016 Bankruptcy
After thirteen consecutive quarters of losses, the company was delisted from the New York Stock Exchange on April 22, 2016, and began trading under the symbol "AROP" as an over-the-counter stock.

Aéropostale filed for Chapter 11 bankruptcy on May 4, 2016, with assets of $354 million. The company closed 113 of its 739 U.S. stores and all 41 (in addition to 20 already closed prior to the filing) in Canada, the majority of which were unprofitable and responsible for the company's losses.

The company exited bankruptcy in September 2016, after a $243 million bid from a consortium of licensing firm Authentic Brands Group,  mall operators Simon Property Group and General Growth Properties, and capital-investment firms Gordon Brothers and Hilco Merchant Resources. By January 2017 Aéropostale had reopened over 500 stores under its new management. Aéropostale products returned to Canada in 2019, through boutiques in Bluenotes stores and a dedicated online shop.

Following the acquisition in 2017, the company transferred its design, production and distribution license in Europe to the London-based LDN Fashion Design group. It has an annual turnover of almost 1.5 billion dollars (2020) and 1,000 stores in the Americas.

See also
Forever 21
Gap Inc.
Old Navy
Pacific Sunwear
Retail apocalypse
List of retailers affected by the retail apocalypse

References

External links

 
 Official P.S. from Aéropostale website
 Aéropostale SEC　Filings

Clothing brands of the United States
Clothing retailers of the United States
Jeans by brand
Clothing companies based in New York City
American companies established in 1987
Clothing companies established in 1987
Retail companies established in 1987
1987 establishments in New York (state)
Companies that filed for Chapter 11 bankruptcy in 2016
Companies that have filed for bankruptcy in Canada
2000s fashion
2010s fashion
Authentic Brands Group